Frans Swart (born 23 June 1962) is a South African sports shooter. He competed in the men's trap event at the 2000 Summer Olympics.

References

External links
 

1962 births
Living people
South African male sport shooters
Olympic shooters of South Africa
Shooters at the 2000 Summer Olympics
Place of birth missing (living people)